Lago di Canterno is a lake in the Province of Frosinone, Lazio, Italy.

References

Lakes of Lazio